Ma Tai may refer to:

 Tzi Ma or Ma Tai, Hong Kong actor
 Matt William Knowles or Ma Tai, China-based American actor